California's 30th State Assembly district is one of 80 California State Assembly districts. It is currently represented by Democrat Dawn Addis of Morro Bay. On December 21st 2021 the new Assembly District 30 Map has been finalized. It includes part of Santa Cruz County, part of Monterey County, and part of San Luis Obispo County.

District profile 
The district encompasses the inland Monterey Bay Area and other parts of the northern Central Coast, as well as the outer San Jose suburb of Morgan Hill. The district is centered on the major agricultural areas of the Pajaro Valley and the Salinas Valley.

Monterey County – 57.5%
 Greenfield
 Gonzales
 King City
 Salinas
 Soledad

All of San Benito County
 Hollister
 San Juan Bautista

Santa Clara County – 5.9%
 Gilroy
 Morgan Hill

Santa Cruz County – 25.2%
 Watsonville

Election results from statewide races

List of assemblymembers 
Due to redistricting, the 30th district has been moved around different parts of the state. The current iteration resulted from the 2011 redistricting by the California Citizens Redistricting Commission.

Election results 1992 - present

2020

2018

2016

2014

2012

2010

2008

2006

2004

2002

2000

1998

1996

1994

1992

See also 
 California State Assembly
 California State Assembly districts
 Districts in California

References

External links 
 District map from the California Citizens Redistricting Commission

30
Government of Monterey County, California
Government of San Benito County, California
Government of Santa Clara County, California
Government of Santa Cruz County, California